Vene Music is an independent Latin music record label based in Coral Gables, Florida. The label is affiliated with Universal Music Latin Entertainment.

Divisions
 Siente Music

Roster
Chico & the Gypsies
Cosculluela
Crazy Design & Carlitos Wey
El Compa Chuy
Elvis Crespo
Farruko
Los Galakticos
Gocho
Héctor Acosta "El Torito"
Henry Santos
Los Huracanes del Norte
Issa Gadala
Ivy Queen
Jerry Rivera
Joseph Fonseca
Kalimete
La Dinastía de Tuzantla
Los Amos
Los Hermanos Rosario
Los Pikadientes
Lucero
Luis Miguel del Amargue
Manny Manuel
Milly Quezada
Monchy & Natalia
Pepe Aguilar
Rogelio Martinez
Tercer Cielo
Tierra Cali
Tito El Bambino
Yanni
Sheryl Rubio

References

American independent record labels
Latin American music record labels